Hotman may refer to:

Hotman, Japanese television program
François Hotman (1524–1590), French Protestant lawyer and writer
Jean Hotman, Marquis de Villers-St-Paul (1552–1636), French diplomat, son of François
Nicolas Hotman (c.1610–1663), composer, violist
Hotman Paris Hutapea, Indonesian lawyer